Rayan Frikeche (born 9 October 1991) is a professional footballer who plays as a defensive midfielder for French club Boulogne.

Club career
Frikeche started his career with Angers SCO, playing almost 100 Ligue 2 matches before signing for AC Ajaccio in June 2016.

On 27 September 2017, Frikeche signed with Bulgarian club Lokomotiv Plovdiv for  years.

In July 2018, Frikeche returned to France with Championnat National side Boulogne.

International career
Frikeche made his debut for the Morocco national under-23 football team at the 2012 Toulon Tournament on 24 May 2012, in a 4–3 defeat against Mexico national under-23 football team. He was then called up to the squad for the 2012 Olympics.

References

External links
 

1991 births
Living people
Sportspeople from Angers
French footballers
Moroccan footballers
Association football midfielders
Ligue 2 players
Championnat National players
First Professional Football League (Bulgaria) players
Angers SCO players
AC Ajaccio players
PFC Lokomotiv Plovdiv players
US Boulogne players
French sportspeople of Moroccan descent
Moroccan expatriate footballers
Moroccan expatriate sportspeople in Bulgaria
Expatriate footballers in Bulgaria
Footballers from Pays de la Loire